The Ejpovice tunnel (Czech: Ejpovický tunel) is a two-tube railway tunnel in the Czech Republic on the Prague–Plzeň railway line. It is located at Ejpovice and therefore bears its name. Since its commissioning in 2018, it has been the longest railway tunnel in the country. It shortens the journey between the cities of Plzeň and Rokycany from 20 to 11 minutes. The tunnel is designed for 200 km/h, but the maximum speed is currently limited to 160 km / h. The tunnel will remain the longest in the country until the planned Ore Mountains Base Tunnel between the Czech Republic and Germany surpasses it.

When building the two tubes, a tunnel boring machine from the manufacturer Herrenknecht was used, with which up to 182 meters were driven per week. The equivalent of 260 million euros was invested in the construction.

References

Tunnels in the Czech Republic
Rokycany District
Buildings and structures in the Plzeň Region
Tunnels completed in 2018
Railway tunnels in Europe
Dual-tube railway tunnels
2018 establishments in the Czech Republic
21st-century architecture in the Czech Republic